Joe Farrell is an Australian visual effects artist. He was nominated for two Academy Awards in the category Best Visual Effects for the films Hereafter and Shang-Chi and the Legend of the Ten Rings.

Selected filmography 
 Hereafter (2010; co-nominated with Michael Owens, Bryan Grill and Stephan Trojansky)
 Shang-Chi and the Legend of the Ten Rings (2021; co-nominated with Christopher Townsend, Sean Noel Walker and Dan Oliver)
 Werewolf by Night (2022)

References

External links 

Living people
Place of birth missing (living people)
Year of birth missing (living people)
Visual effects artists
Visual effects supervisors